Rafael Bastos Hocsman, better known as Rafinha Bastos or simply Rafi Bastos (born December 5, 1976) is a Brazilian comedian, actor, journalist and television personality.

Biography
Rafinha Bastos was born to a Jewish family in Porto Alegre, Brazil. His ancestors immigrated from Russia. He received scholarship in 1999 to play basketball at Chadron State College in Chadron, Nebraska. Later, he played basketball in Brazil for Sogipa, from Porto Alegre, in 2000, helping the team to win the title of the State Basketball Championship in Rio Grande do Sul.

Rafinha Bastos was a former host of "CQC" a popular TV show in Brazil. Since May 2010, he also hosts another TV show, "A Liga", which is broadcast by Band TV channel.

In 2010, Bastos, together with comedian Danilo Gentili and producer Italo Gusso, opened a comedy club in Brazil, in the city of São Paulo.

In 2011, Rafinha became worldwide famous after The New York Times named him the world's most influential person on Twitter.

In CQC's September 19, 2011 live broadcast, Bastos made an allegedly dark humor joke about singer Wanessa; when Marcelo Tas, the show's main host, remarked how beautiful the singer looked pregnant, Bastos replied: "Muito. Comeria ela e o bebê." ("Absolutely. I'd do her and the baby"). The joke caused controversy among audiences and was taken with severe criticism. Following the next broadcast on September 26, Bastos was suspended from the show. He was rumoured to have asked his resignation on his contract, but the fact was not confirmed. On October 13, Wanessa and her husband Marcus Buaiz sued Bastos for R$100,000 claiming personal injury. Currently, Rafinha works in stand-up comedy and regularly posts to YouTube.

In 2016, it was announced that Bastos would be a host on the Netflix reality show Ultimate Beastmaster.

Television

Filmography

References

External links 
  Official Site 
 

1976 births
Living people
People from Porto Alegre
Brazilian Jews
Jewish Brazilian male actors
Brazilian male film actors
Brazilian male comedians
Brazilian expatriates in the United States
Pontifical Catholic University of Rio Grande do Sul alumni
Shorty Award winners